Devanagari Extended is a Unicode block containing cantilation marks for writing the Samaveda, and nasalization marks for the Devanagari script.

Block

History
The following Unicode-related documents record the purpose and process of defining specific characters in the Devanagari Extended block:

See also 
Devanagari in Unicode

References 

Unicode blocks